King Hye was the 4th king of Mahan confederacy. He reigned from 157 BCE to 144 BCE. His true name was Hye. He was succeeded by Myung of Samhan (Myung Wang).

References

See also 
 List of Korean monarchs
 History of Korea

Monarchs of the Mahan confederacy
2nd-century BC Korean people